Nikolai Gavrilov (ru)
 Gapal Gadzhiev (ru)
 Gaydar Gadzhiev
 Nukhidin Gadzhiev (ru)
 Musa Gazimagomadov (ru)
 Magomed-Kazim Gayrkhanov (ru)
 Aleksey Galkin
 Grigory Galkin (ru)
 Aleksandr Galle (ru)
 Nikolai Galushkin
 Magomed Gamaztov (ru)
 Feodosy Ganus (ru)
 Pavel Gaponenko (ru)
 Artyom Garmash (ru)
 Aleksandr Garnaev (ru)
 Pyotr Geysler (ru)
 Erik Geptner (ru)
 Valery Gerasimov
 Magomet Gerbekov (ru)
 Aleksandr Gerdt (ru)
 Yuri Gidzenko
 Magomed Gimbatov (ru)
 Baatar Gindeev (ru)
 Viktor Glukharyov (ru)
 Aleksey Goynyak (ru)
 Dzhanibek Golaev
 Aleksandr Golovashkin (ru)
 Ivan Golubev (ru)
 Svyatoslav Golubyatnikov (ru)
 Valery Gorbenko (ru)
 Vladimir Gorbunov (ru)
 Vadim Gordeev (ru)
 Vitaly Gorin (ru)
 Valery Gorobets (ru)
 Anatoly Gorshkov (ru)
 Dmitry Gorshkov (ru)
 Yevgeny Goryunov (ru)
 Sergey Goryachev (ru)
 Dmitry Grebyonkin (ru)
 Konstantin Greblyuk (ru)
 Vladimir Grechanik (ru)
 Aleksandr Gribovsky (ru)
 Mikhail Grigorevsky (ru)
 Semyon Grigorenko (ru)
 Sergey Grigorov (ru)
 Dmitry Grigorev (ru)
 Vadim Gridnev (ru)
 Mikhail Gritsko (ru)
 Sergey Gritsyuk (ru)
 Anatoly Grishchenko (ru)
 Sergey Gromov (ru)
 Igor Grudnov (ru)
 Igor Gurov (ru)
 Georgy Guslyakov (ru)
 Andrey Gushchin (ru)

References 
 

Heroes G